"Down by the Riverside" (also known as "Ain't Gonna Study War No More" and "Gonna lay down my burden") is an African-American spiritual. Its roots date back to before the American Civil War, though it was first published in 1918 in Plantation Melodies: A Collection of Modern, Popular and Old-time Negro-Songs of the Southland, Chicago, the Rodeheaver Company. The song has alternatively been known as "Ain' go'n' to study war no mo'", "Ain't Gwine to Study War No More", "Down by de Ribberside", "Going to Pull My War-Clothes" and "Study war no more". The song was first recorded by the Fisk University jubilee quartet in 1920 (published by Columbia in 1922), and there are at least 14 black gospel recordings before World War II.

Because of its pacifistic imagery, "Down by the Riverside" has also been used as an anti-war protest song, especially during the Vietnam War. The song is also included in collections of socialist and labor songs.

Lyrics 
The song has many lyrical variations, though usually, each stanza follows a standard form, with one sentence that differs from one stanza to the next. The song often begins:

With the chorus:

Other lines that can appear in stanzas, in place of "Gonna lay down my burden", include:
 Gonna shake hands with every man
 Gonna lay down my heavy load
 Gonna lay down my sword and shield
 Gonna stick my sword in the golden sand
 Gonna try on my long white robe
 Gonna try on my starry crown
 Gonna put on my golden shoes
 Gonna talk with the Prince of Peace
 Gonna shake hands around the world
 Gonna cross the river Jordan
 Gonna climb up on that mountain
 Gonna climb the road to heaven

Themes
The song suggests baptism in water, using the metaphor of crossing the River Jordan to enter the Promised Land in the Old Testament. The refrain of "ain't gonna study war no more" is a reference to a quotation found in the Book of Isaiah, chapter 2, verse 4 (KJV): "nation shall not lift up sword against nation, neither shall they learn war any more." One of the lines also references Jesus Christ, specifically, "Gonna talk with the Prince of Peace," as the "Prince of Peace" is a common name of Jesus. As one prays to Jesus, we speak to him, and if we enter heaven, we can speak with him there, as referenced in the part of the line stating, "gonna talk". Another line references heaven, specifically,"Gonna climb the road to heaven," which references walking on the road to heaven above, after death. The road is also a metaphor for the difficult journey of life, as a road and travel can be dangerous and full of trial. This sentiment is similar to the line, "Gonna climb up on that mountain," which again is symbolic of the arduous journey of life. Much of this spiritual contains Biblical imagery. In general, the song is focused on the concept of leaving the feelings of anger and pessimism behind, as to have a new spiritual dress, in the setting of a riverside, prior to going across it.

Recordings
Artists who have recorded the song include:
  
Al Hirt released a version on his 1961 album, He's the King and His Band. and a live version on his 1965 album, Live at Carnegie Hall
 American R&B and boogie-woogie pianist and singer Little Willie Littlefield recorded a version for his 1997 album The Red One.
 Arty Hall & His Radio Rubes, 1937
 Benjamin Luxton & David Willison, 1924
 Sister Rosetta Tharpe, 1944
 Big Bill Broonzy, 1952
 Bill Haley & His Comets performed a live twist version on the 1962 album Twistin' Knights at the Roundtable.
 Bing Crosby and Gary Crosby (recorded November 4, 1953  – reached No. 28 in the UK charts).
 The Blind Boys of Alabama (on Amazing Grace and Down in New Orleans)
 Bunk Johnson, 1942
 Chimène Badi, 2011 (Gospel & Soul album)
 Chris Barber's Jazz Band, 1954
 Clara Ward
 Cliff Holland
 C. Mae Frierson Moore, 1925
 Les Compagnons de la chanson (under the title Qu'il fait bon vivre)
 The Dirty Dozen Brass Band
  Dixie Jubilee Singers, 1928
 Dorothy Love Coates
 The Dustbowl Revival, 2014
 Elvis Presley (on Frankie and Johnny and Million Dollar Quartet)
 Etta James
 The Four Knights
 The Four Lads, 1953
 Frederic Rzewski (a classical piano version)
 The Golden Echo Boys [Of God's Bible School], 1930
 Golden Gate Quartet
 Grandpa Elliott and other artists (Playing for Change project), 2014
 Jimmy Durante
 Jimmie Lunceford & his Orchestra, 1940
 Jimmy Smith & Wes Montgomery, 1966
 The Kingpins
 Louis Armstrong (on Hello Louis! and Louis and the Good Book)
 Lead Belly
 Lester McFarland & Robert Gardner, 1927
 Magomayev Muslim, Soviet Union, 1972 
 Mahalia Jackson
 Million Dollar Quartet, Broadway musical and original cast recording
 Michael Penn (on Mr. Hollywood Jr., 1947)
 Dr. Michael White, on his album Dancing in the Sky, 2004
 Missouri Pacific Diamond Jubilee Quartette, 1927
Moon Mullican and the Plainsmen, early 1960s.
 Morehouse College Quartet, 1923
 Mustard & Gravy 'Dixie's Tastiest Combination', 1938
 Nat King Cole
 Norfolk Jazz & Jubilee Quartets, 1927
 Oscar Celestine, 1928
 Paul Anka (on his 1958 album "Paul Anka")
 Pete Seeger
 Peter, Paul and Mary (on Around the Campfire)
 Raffi (on Bananaphone)
 The Ramblin' Riversiders
 The Real Ale and Thunder Band "At Vespers", recorded at St. Laurence's Parish Church, Downton by BBC Radio Solent, 18 November 1984.
 Roy Hamilton
 Sam Morgan's Jazz Band, 1927
 The Seekers
 Sister Rosetta Tharpe (included in the U.S. National Recording Registry)
 Snooks Eaglin, 1960
 Sonny Terry & Brownie McGhee
 Sweet Honey in the Rock (on We All...Everyone Of Us)
 Taj Mahal, 2013 (on Divided & United, ATO Records)
 Trini Lopez as part of a medley with "Gotta Travel On", "Marianne", "When the Saints Go Marching In", and "Volare".
 Van Morrison (on the CD reissue of Tupelo Honey)
  Vaughan Quartet, 1924
 Willie Nelson and Wynton Marsalis on their 2008 live album, Two Men with the Blues

Soundtrack appearances 

The song was featured as a DLC in the Nintendo Wii game Just Dance 2 and Just Dance 3
 
It was used as background music in two episodes of SpongeBob SquarePants known as "Survival of the Idiots" and "Selling Out."

It was played in the Star Trek: The Next Generation episode "The Next Phase".

Parodies and alternative lyrics 
The song was the basis of an Allan Sherman parody called "Don't Buy the Liverwurst". The tune of "Down by the Riverside" was also used in a McDonald's's 1960s jingle, "McDonald's Is My Kind of Place".  In episode 72 of the animated television series Animaniacs, this song was parodied as "U.N. Me" about the United Nations Headquarters and was later released on their 2nd album, Yakko's World.

In the UK, "Down by the Riverside" was parodied for use by a radio commercial on some local radio stations (namely Mix 107) about eco-friendly travel choices (i.e. leaving the car for one day a week).

JibJab also used the melody in a song about the year 2012 in review (called "2012: The End Is Here!").

An episode of Liv & Maddie had Liv singing a song about her musical group with senior citizens, "The Golden Chords, " at a retirement home, to the tune of this song.

See also
 List of anti-war songs

References 

Gospel songs
African-American spiritual songs
Anti-war songs
Elvis Presley songs
Van Morrison songs
Al Hirt songs
Peter, Paul and Mary songs
United States National Recording Registry recordings
1918 songs
Public domain music